Ixodes ceylonensis is a hard-bodied tick of the genus Ixodes. It is found in India and Sri Lanka. It is an obligate ectoparasite of mammals.

Parasitism
Adults parasitize various smaller mammals such as Herpestes smithii, Rattus rattus, Crocidura miya, Suncus montanus, Solisorex pearsoni, Madromys blanfordi, Felis chaus, Felis bengalensis. Nymphs were recorded from Suncus murinus and Rattus species, whereas larva was found from these species and also from Mus booduga. It is a potential vector of Kyasanur Forest disease virus.

References

External links
Hosts and life cycle of Ixodes ceylonensis Kohls, 1950, with descriptions of its male, nymph, and larva.

ceylonensis
Animals described in 1950